Dembiya (Amharic: ደምቢያ Dembīyā; also transliterated Dembea, Dambya, Dembya, Dambiya, etc.) is a historic region of Ethiopia, intimately linked with Lake Tana. According to the account of Manuel de Almeida, Dembiya was "bounded on East by Begemder, on South by Gojjam, on West by Agaws of Achefer and Tangha. Lake Tsana, formerly called Dambaya, is in this region." The region was governed by Ahmed ibn Ibrahim al-Ghazi and his soldiers of Adal in the sixteenth century. Alexander Murray, in his preface to the third volume of Bruce's account, further describes it as "on the east it includes Foggora, Dara, and Alata; on the north-east Gondar, the metropolis, and the rich district beneath it; on the southwest, the district of Bed (the plain barren country) and, on the west, the lands around Waindaga and Dingleber."

Dembiya was incorporated into the Begemder province (which previously only included lands to the east of Lake Tana) during the reign of Emperor Haile Selassie, and in 1996 became a woreda of the Amhara Region.

References

Regions of Ethiopia
Geography of Ethiopia
North Gondar Zone